Imrul Karim is a Bangladeshi cricketer. He made his List A debut for Partex Sporting Club in the 2016–17 Dhaka Premier Division Cricket League on 1 June 2017. He made his first-class debut for Chittagong Division in the 2017–18 National Cricket League on 22 September 2017.

References

External links
 

Year of birth missing (living people)
Living people
Bangladeshi cricketers
Chittagong Division cricketers
Partex Sporting Club cricketers
Place of birth missing (living people)